Patrick Hivon (born July 5, 1975) is a Canadian actor from Montreal, Quebec. He was a Jutra Award nominee for Best Supporting Actor at the 17th Jutra Awards in 2015 for Guardian Angel (L'Ange gardien), a Gémeaux Award nominee as Best Supporting Actor in a Drama Series in 2015 for Nouvelle adresse, a Canadian Screen Award nominee for Best Supporting Actor at the 4th Canadian Screen Awards in 2016 for Ville-Marie, and a Prix Iris nominee for Best Actor at the 21st Quebec Cinema Awards in 2019 for We Are Gold (Nous sommes Gold).

Hivon was primarily associated with stage and television roles, including the television series 2 frères, Rumeurs, Lance et compte and Providence, and theatre productions of Daniel Danis' Le Langue-à-langue des chiens de roche and Michel Marc Bouchard's Les feluettes, until landing his first major film role in the 2010 film Crying Out (À l'origine d'un cri).

He has also appeared in the films L'Affaire Dumont, Guardian Angel (L'Ange gardien), Émilie, Noir, Bad Seeds (Les Mauvaises herbes), A Kid (Le Fils de Jean), Shooting Star (Comme une comète), Restless River (La rivière sans repos), Mont Foster and Babysitter, and the television series Karl & Max, Vertige and The Night Logan Woke Up (La nuit où Laurier Gaudreault s'est réveillé).

References

External links

1975 births
Canadian male film actors
Canadian male stage actors
Canadian male television actors
Male actors from Montreal
French Quebecers
Living people